The RN-14 National Highway connects from Tadjoura to Obock, and is  long, it runs along most of the Gulf of Tadjoura coastline of the Djibouti.

References

Roads in Djibouti